Cavin-2 or Serum deprivation-response protein (SDPR) is a protein that in humans is encoded by the SDPR gene. Cavin-2 is highly expressed in a variety of human endothelial cells.

This gene encodes a calcium-independent phospholipid-binding protein whose expression increases in serum-starved cells. This protein has also been shown to be a substrate for protein kinase C (PKC) phosphorylation.

Function 
Cavin-2 is required for blood vessel formation (angiogenesis) in humans and zebrafish and required also for the endothelial cell proliferation, migration and invasion in humans. Cavin-2 plays an important role in endothelial cell maintenance by regulating eNOS activity. Cavin-2 controls the generation of nitric oxide (NO) in human endothelial cells by controlling the activity and stability of the protein endothelial nitric-oxide synthase (eNOS).

Secretion 
Cavin-2 is highly secreted from human endothelial cells (HUVEC), they are secreted through endothelial microparticles (EMPs) but not exosomes and is required for EMP biogenesis.

Clinical significance 

SDPR is shown to act as a metastasis suppressor by xenograft studies utilizing breast cancer cell lines. 
SDPR may elicit its metastasis suppressor function by directly interacting with ERK and limiting its pro-survival role. Moreover, it is suggested that SDPR is silenced during breast cancer progression by promoter DNA methylation. Metastasis suppressor role of SDPR may go beyond breast cancer since tumor samples from bladder, colorectal, lung, pancreatic, and ovarian cancers as well as sarcomas also exhibited loss of SDPR expression.

References

Further reading